Leonard Wayne Merrick (born April 23, 1952) is a Canadian former professional ice hockey player who played 774 career National Hockey League games for the St. Louis Blues, California Seals, Cleveland Barons and New York Islanders.

Playing career
Wayne Merrick helped provide toughness and grit to the talent-laden New York Islanders of the late 1970s and early 1980s, acquired from the Cleveland Barons in exchange for J.P. Parise and Jean Potvin during the 1977-78 season. He played on the famed "Banana Line" centering John Tonelli and Bob Nystrom. He won four Stanley Cups with the Islanders between 1980 and 1983. He scored the Cup-clinching goal in Game Five of the 1981 Stanley Cup Finals.

Career statistics

Regular season and playoffs

International

References

External links

1952 births
Living people
California Golden Seals players
Canadian ice hockey centres
Cleveland Barons (NHL) players
Denver Spurs (WHL) players
Sportspeople from Sarnia
National Hockey League first-round draft picks
New York Islanders players
Ottawa 67's players
St. Louis Blues draft picks
St. Louis Blues players
Stanley Cup champions
Ice hockey people from Ontario
Canadian expatriate ice hockey players in the United States